"Anyone I Want to Be" is a song by Polish singer Roksana Węgiel. It represented Poland in the Junior Eurovision Song Contest 2018, where it won the competition. The song was written by Maegan Cottone, Nathan Duvall, Cutfather, Peter Wallevik, Daniel Davidsen, Małgorzata Uściłowska, and Patryk Kumór, and was released on 6 November 2018.

Background and composition
"Anyone I Want to Be" was written by British-American songwriter Maegan Cottone, British songwriter Nathan Duvall, Danish producer Cutfather, Danish songwriter Peter Wallevik, Danish-Norwegian musician Daniel Davidsen, Polish singer-songwriter Małgorzata Uściłowska and Polish songwriter Patryk Kumór.

Shortly after its victory in Junior Eurovision, Cutfather revealed that the song had been written around five years before submitting it to Polish broadcaster Telewizja Polska (TVP) for the competition. Among other international artists, Iggy Azalea and Rita Ora were previously offered the song.

Junior Eurovision Song Contest

On 21 September 2018, Węgiel was announced by Polish broadcaster Telewizja Polska (TVP) as Poland's entrant in the Junior Eurovision Song Contest 2018, to be held in Minsk, Belarus. Her song was later revealed to be titled "Anyone I Want to Be", and was released on 6 November along with its music video. The contest took place on 25 November  in Minsk-Arena. Węgiel was drawn to perform last, following Ela Mangion of Malta. In the jury voting sequence, Poland had placed seventh, receiving 79 points total and one set of the maximum 12 points from France. However, Poland went on to score the highest number of online votes, receiving 136 points. Combined, this left Poland with an overall score of 215 points, placing above runner-up France by a difference of 12 points.

Węgiel's win in the contest gave Poland its first win in the Junior Eurovision Song Contest; they had never previously won the Eurovision Song Contest either. As winners, Poland was given the right of first refusal to host the Junior Eurovision Song Contest 2019, which was held in Gliwice.

Music video
The music video for "Anyone I Want to Be" was released along with the song's release as a digital download, on 6 November 2018. The video surpassed one million views on YouTube within two weeks, becoming the most-watched video of the 2018 contest.

Track listing

Charts

Weekly charts

Year-end charts

Certifications

Release history

References

2018 singles
2018 songs
Junior Eurovision Song Contest winning songs
Polish-language songs
Songs written by Cutfather
Songs written by Maegan Cottone
Songs written by Peter Wallevik
Songs written by Daniel Davidsen